The Maple Marindo or Haifeng (海锋), Maple Hysoul or Haishang (海尚), and Maple Haiyu (海域) are 4-door compact sedans and 5-door compact liftbacks from Chinese manufacturer, Shanghai Maple, subsidiary of Geely Automobile. It is essentially the sedan version of the Maple Hisoon compact hatchback.

Shanghai Maple Haiyu
The 1.5 L powered Shanghai Maple Haiyu 303 was introduced in 2004, 

As of 2005, the Maple Haiyu is available as both a sedan called the MA 303 and hatchback called the AA 205.

Shanghai Maple Haishang (Hysoul)
The 1.8 L powered Shanghai Maple Haishang (海尚) 305 was introduced in 2005. The facelifted model was named the Hysoul, featuring restyled front and rear ends featuring new front fenders, front bumpers, new hood, and new tail lamps. The styling of the front end was heavily inspired by the Audi A4 of the time and the Citroën ZX. The Marindo 305 was shown at the Frankfurt Motor Show in 2005 along with four Geely models.

Maple Haixuan
The Maple Haixuan (海炫) is the hatchback variant of the Hysoul model as they feature the same front end designs. The Haixuan is only available with the 1.5-litre inline-4 engine producing 94hp for the 2006 model year.

Shanghai Maple Haifeng (Marindo)
Based on the Shanghai Maple Hysoul, the Shanghai Maple Haifeng was introduced later featuring restyled front and rear ends featuring new rear fenders, front and rear bumpers, new trunk lid, and new tail lamps. The styling of the rear end was heavily inspired by the first generation Cadillac CTS. Production ended in 2010.

References

Marindo
Front-wheel-drive vehicles
Compact cars
Cars of China
Cars introduced in 2004

2010s cars